Owenia acidula, commonly known as emu apple, is small or medium-sized tree of outback woodlands native to Australia. It may grow to ten metres tall.

The pinnate leaves are bright green and shiny, with leaflets 2–5 cm long. Broken twigs ooze a milky sap. The edible fruit is purplish-red with paler speckles, 2–4 cm wide with a large stone-like seed.

Uses
The fruit pulp is an Aboriginal bushfood and apparently causes hallucinations. The fruits ripen after falling off the tree, and have a sour flavour.

Gallery

References

External links

Bushfood
Meliaceae
Sapindales of Australia
Flora of New South Wales
Flora of the Northern Territory
Flora of Queensland
Trees of Australia
Taxa named by Ferdinand von Mueller